Big Brother 1 is the first season of the Croatian reality television series Big Brother that premiered on 18 September 2004 and ending on 26 December 2004, and ran for 100 days. It received high ratings and proved to be one of the rare successes for RTL Televizija in its first six months on Croatian television markets.

Despite the huge commercial success and becoming a cultural phenomenon of its season, the first season was subjected to much criticism. Andrija Hebrang, Croatian health minister at the time, complained about contestants smoking while the programme on air, which was against Croatian laws.  In response to this, later live broadcasts were time-delayed.  The show also created minor controversy due to a single homophobic statement ("If I knew I had a fag friend, I would kill him. I would kill him") made by Zdravko Lamot.

Other critics complained about lack of diversity among contestants who didn't represent the average of Croatian population. They were mostly all in the mid-20s, attending college, having a liberal mindset and coming from well-to-do or upper-middle-class families. Another exception was Saša Tkalčević, a 32-year-old biker from Bjelovar, husband and father of two children. He almost immediately established himself as the frontrunner, indicating that the audience for the show and pool of potential voters was much older than previously thought.

In this first season, there were 12 original housemates. Later, two new housemates entered the house.

Antonija Blaće  who was evicted one week before the final is since then one of the most popular TV hosts in Croatia.

Nominations Table

Notes

 : After Krešo left the House on Day 22, the public vote was suspended and the eviction was cancelled.
 : As new Housemates, Željko and Vlatko were exempt from the nominations process this week.
 : This week, the public were voting for a winner, rather than to evict.

References

2004 Croatian television seasons
Big Brother (Croatian TV series)
Croatia